KDKR (91.3 MHz) is a listener-supported FM radio station licensed to Decatur, Texas and broadcasting to northern areas of the Dallas-Fort Worth Metroplex in North Texas.  The station is owned by Penfold Communications, Inc., and it airs a Christian talk and teaching radio format.  The studios and offices are on Diamond Oaks Drive in Fort Worth.

National and local religious leaders are heard on KDKR, including Chuck Smith, David Jeremiah, Alistair Begg, Charles Stanley and Greg Laurie. 

KDKR is also heard on two FM translators, K248BC at 97.5 MHz in Dallas, and K260BP at 99.9 MHz in Irving, Texas.

Translators

External links
KDKR official website

 DFW Radio/TV History

DKR
DKR
Radio stations established in 1960
1960 establishments in Texas